Benzion Hoffman (1 May 1874 – 14 October 1954), best known by the pen name Zivion (Tsivyen), was a Yiddish writer, journalist, and political activist.

Biography
Hoffman was born in the village of Krug, near Boysk, in the Courland Governorate. He studied at various yeshivas in the region, meanwhile becoming acquainted with Maskilic literature, before moving to Vilna at the age of sixteen. There, he was ordained as a rabbi by av beis din Rabbi Shlomo ha-Kohen. He later studied at the Universities of Karlsruhe, Heidelberg, Berlin, and Bern, and obtained a doctorate in engineering.

Hoffman published under the pseudonyms Zivion (a near-anagram of ), Tz., Ish Tikva ('Man of Hope'), Afna, and Rozman. The following year, he co-founded a socialist Zionist circle in Riga and joined the Bundist movement. He attended the Fifth Zionist Congress in 1901 as a correspondent for Forverts, and later took part in the 5th Congress of the Russian Social Democratic Labour Party.

He emigrated to New York in 1908, where he became a central figure in American Jewish journalism. In the years that followed, Hoffman edited and contributed to the Hebrew daily Ha-Yom, the Yiddish periodicals Der fraynd, Di naye post, Di tsukunft, Der tog, Di naye velt, and Gerekhtikeyt, and the Yiddish section of the English-Yiddish Encyclopedic Dictionary.

He died at his home in New York City on 14 October 1954.

Selected bibliography

References

1874 births
1954 deaths
20th-century American essayists
American male essayists
American people of Latvian-Jewish descent
Bundists
Emigrants from the Russian Empire to the United States
Essayists from the Russian Empire
Hebrew-language writers
Jewish American journalists
Journalists from New York City
Labor Zionists
People from Courland Governorate
Yiddish-language journalists
20th-century American male writers
19th-century pseudonymous writers
20th-century pseudonymous writers